The Trafficking in Persons Report, or the TIP Report, is an annual report issued since 2001 by the U.S. State Department's Office to Monitor and Combat Trafficking in Persons. It ranks governments based on their perceived efforts to acknowledge and combat human trafficking.

Ranking system 
The report divides nations into tiers based on their compliance with standards outlined in the Victims of Trafficking and Violence Protection Act of 2000 (TVPA). These tiers are:
  Tier 1 countries whose governments fully comply with the TVPA's minimum standards.
  Tier 2 countries  whose governments do not fully comply with all of TVPA’s minimum standards, but are making significant efforts to bring themselves into compliance with those standards.
  Tier 2 watchlist countries whose governments do not fully comply with the TVPA’s minimum standards, but are making significant efforts to bring themselves into compliance with those standards and:
 The absolute number of victims of severe forms of trafficking is very significant or is significantly increasing; or
 There is a failure to provide evidence of increasing efforts to combat severe forms of trafficking in persons from the previous year; or
 The determination that a country is making significant efforts to bring themselves into compliance with minimum standards was based on commitments by the country to take additional future steps over the next year.
  Tier 3 countries whose governments do not fully comply with the minimum standards and are not making significant efforts to do so.

There are also a few special cases (Special Tier) such as Yemen, where the civil conflict and humanitarian crisis make gaining information difficult; and Sint Maarten, where the devastation caused by Hurricane Irma has made reporting difficult.

Criticism 
Some critics of the Trafficking in Persons Report focus on how its methodology could be improved. For example, one recent academic paper suggests how the rankings could better incorporate risk factors of trafficking in order to focus more on prevention. Another critic argues that the Report should better incorporate "international rules that states (including the USA) have collectively developed and freely accepted," rather than focusing on criteria drawn up solely by U.S. politicians.

Other critics more fundamentally question its methodology and sources, such as anthropologist Laura Agustín, who writes that the Report "relies on CIA, police and embassy guesstimates of situations that are not understood the same way across all cultures and social classes."

Hero Acting to End Modern Slavery Award 

As part of the report the Department of State announces the awarding of the Hero Acting to End Modern Slavery Awards to a number of individuals. The first such awards were made in 2004. Awards are made for actions taken to protect victims, bring offenders to justice or to raise awareness of modern slavery.  More than 110 individuals from more than 60 countries have been honored so far.  Award winners are invited to a large reception in the United States followed by a tour of several American cities.

Notes

References

External links 
 State Department's Trafficking in Persons Report website

Human trafficking
Reports of the United States government
United States Department of State publications